Frank L. Cioffi, of Baruch College is Frank Cioffi's nephew.<ref name = NYT91215 >"There Is No Theory of Everything". Simon Critchley in "The Stone" blog in The New York Times September 12, 2015</ref>

Frank Cioffi (11 January 1928 – 1 January 2012) was an American philosopher educated in New York and Oxford.

Cioffi held posts at the University of Singapore, the University of Kent and the University of Essex, where he was a founding member of the Department of Philosophy.

He wrote extensively on Sigmund Freud and psychoanalysis, Ludwig Wittgenstein, and behaviour and explanation.

On 29 July 1989 he made an extended appearance on the British TV discussion programme After Dark, alongside, among others, Steven Rose, The Bishop of Durham, Dorothy Rowe and Michael Bentine.

Works
 Wittgenstein on Freud and Frazer, Cambridge University Press (1998), trade paperback, 310 pages  
 Freud and the Question of Pseudoscience, Open Court (1998), trade paperback, 313 pages  

References

Further reading
 David Ellis, afterword by Nicholas Bunnin, Frank Cioffi: The Philosopher in Shirt Sleeves'', Bloomsbury Academic (June 18, 2015), hardcover, 200 pages. .

1928 births
2012 deaths
20th-century American philosophers
Academic staff of the National University of Singapore
Academics of the University of Kent
Academics of the University of Essex
Alumni of Ruskin College